The Eugene Mountains are a mountain range in Pershing County, Nevada.

References 

Mountain ranges of Nevada
Mountain ranges of Pershing County, Nevada